Pseudobargylia is a little-known genus of thread-legged bug in the subfamily Emesinae. Species of this genus are not adapted for spiderwebs like some other members of the subfamily. Members of the genus occur in Tasmania and Australia. Tasmanian species of this genus are wingless, an unusual characteristic for true bugs.

Partial species list

Pseudobargylia alata
Pseudobargylia iuncea

References

Reduviidae
Cimicomorpha genera
Insects of Oceania